The Los Angeles Country Club is a golf and country club on the west coast of the United States, located in Los Angeles, California.

History
In the fall of 1897, a group of Los Angeles residents organized the Los Angeles Golf Club, and a  lot was leased at the corner of Pico and Alvarado streets (now part of the Alvarado Terrace Historic District) for a nine-hole golf course. Called "The Windmill Links," the course was named for a makeshift clubhouse crafted from the bottom of an abandoned windmill. Through the middle of 1898, this site served as the club's home until the course became too crowded. The club was removed to Pico Heights, at Hobart and 16th streets. The new home was named "The Convent Links" for its location behind a convent near Rosedale Cemetery. Again, nine holes were laid out for play, but by the spring of 1899, this course and clubhouse had also become too restricted for play.

The clubhouse was transported intact to a new site in Beverly Hills, and it was expanded there. The club also laid out an 18-hole course. The club reopened on May 30, 1911. It now has 36 holes of golf, and tennis courts. The original golf course was laid out by Joe Sartori, Ed Tufts, Norman Macbeth, and Charles Orr. Later, the courses were redesigned by Herbert Fowler and George C. Thomas, Jr., and again by Thomas with William P. Bell in 1927–28.

Hosts national and international championships
The club hosted the 1930 United States Women's Amateur Golf Championship; Glenna Collett Vare defeated Virginia Van Wie in the final match. The club hosted the 1954 U.S. Junior Amateur Golf Championship; Foster Bradley defeated Al Geiberger in the final match. The club hosted the 2017 Walker Cup, won by the United States.

In 1996 and 1997 an extensive renovation of the North and South courses was completed. In February 2010, an  extensive restoration of the North Course by Gil Hanse and Thomas biographer Geoff Shackelford took place to return the course to George C. Thomas, Jr.'s design from 1921. The course reopened in October 2010.

Hosts PGA Tour events

The North course hosted the first Los Angeles Open  in 1926, and it returned four times: 1934, 1935, 1936, and 1940.
 The most recent in 1940, won by Lawson Little, was plagued by heavy rains.

2023 U.S. Open
On July 22, 2015, the United States Golf Association (USGA) announced that Los Angeles Country Club was selected to host the 123rd U.S. Open in June 2023. The first major championship held at the club, it will be the first in Los Angeles area in 28 years, and the area's first U.S Open in 75 years.

Tournament history 
Los Angeles Open

 The playoff in 1935 was 18 holes and was won by two strokes, 73 to 75, and both earned the same amount.

Notable members
 J. Win Austin, Los Angeles City Council member, 1941–43
 Robert L. Burns, Los Angeles City Council member, 1929–45
 Arthur Letts, department store founder

See also
Membership discrimination in California social clubs

References

External links

Golf clubs and courses in Los Angeles
1897 establishments in California
Clubs and societies in the United States
Walker Cup venues
Holmby Hills, Los Angeles
Wilshire Boulevard